The Mulgrave Sugar Mill is a sugar mill in Gordonvale, Cairns Region, Queensland, Australia. It commenced operations in 1896. It is operated by MSF Sugar, a subsidiary of the Mitr Phol Group. It is also known as Mulgrave Central Mill.

History 

Richard Blackwell was a pioneer settler in the Gordonvale area. On 18 October 1879, took up land in the Mulgrave River area known as Plain Camp, near where Gordonvale is now located. He reportedly made a gift of part of this land for the establishment of the Mulgrave Sugar Mill. The Sugar Works Guarantee Act of 1893 provided for the erection of approved Central Mills on a government loan if farmers mortgaged their land as security. After the principal and interest had been met, these Central Mills were to be handed to the growers as Cooperative Mills. The Mulgrave settler's organisation evolved from a meeting held at Tom Mackey's farm, at which Richard Blackwell was in attendance. A provisional directorate was formed with Mackey as Chairman. The original memorandum of the Association of the Mulgrave Central Mill Co Ltd dated 14 November 1893, was registered in Brisbane 20 April 1895. Signatories to this included Richard Blackwell. The nominal capital of £40,000 was increased to £60,000 in 1896. The Mulgrave Central Mill enterprise proceeded rapidly, and Richard Blackwell was one of the first directors of the Mulgrave Mill.

Locomotives 

The Mill uses locomotives built in the 1950s and 1960s. Locomotive types include:  
0-6-0DM Com-Eng
0-6-0DH Com-Eng
0-6-0DH Clyde         
4wDM EMB
B-B DH Walkers BFE

See also 
 List of sugar mills in Queensland
 Cairns-Mulgrave Tramway
 List of tramways in Queensland

References

Attribution 

This Wikipedia article contains text from "The Queensland heritage register" published by the State of Queensland under CC-BY 3.0 AU licence (accessed on 7 July 2014, archived on 8 October 2014).

Sugar mills in Queensland
Gordonvale, Queensland
Buildings and structures in Far North Queensland